Jose "Pinggoy" Revilla (December 7, 1922 – March 9, 2011), professionally known as Armando Goyena, was a Philippine actor and matinée idol who was popular during the 1950s.

Family
Revilla was married to Francisca "Paquita" Roces and the couple had eight children: Maritess, Tina, Johnny, Ces, Pita, Rossi, Malu, and Cita. Two daughters became popular movie stars during the 1970s: Maritess and Tina Revilla. Among his grandchildren who joined show business are Bernard and Mico Palanca, Bianca Araneta and Lexi Schulze. His only son Jose or Johnny is also an actor and TV host of Pinoy Wrestling on PTV 4 in 1988.

Movie career
Together with his onscreen movie partner, Tessie Quintana, Revilla appeared in Prinsesang Basahan, Hawayana, Tia Loleng, Virginia, and Isabelita. Goyena, together with Cecilia Lopez and Jonny Reyes, starred in Anak ng Berdugo. He stopped acting in 1958 after getting married.

He resumed acting in the early 1990s. In 1995, he played Don Eugenio López in Chito Roño’s Eskapo. Roño used him again in 2001 for Yamashita: The Tiger's Treasure. His final film appearance was Annie B. in 2004.

Filmography

Movies

Television

Death
Goyena died on March 9, 2011, aged 88, from a pulmonary embolism.
His crypt and remains shares with his wife Paquita, and grandson Miko Palanca at Santuario De San Antonio in Forbes Park, Makati in Makati

References

External links

1922 births
2011 deaths
Male actors from Manila
Deaths from pulmonary embolism
20th-century Filipino male actors
21st-century Filipino male actors
Filipino male film actors